Martin Milkov (Bulgarian: Мартин Милков; born 25 December 1999) is a Bulgarian footballer who plays as a defender for Juventus Malchika.

Career

Ludogorets Razgrad
Milkov made his professional debut for the first team on 20 May 2018 in a league match against Botev Plovdiv.

Career statistics

Club

References

External links
 

1999 births
Living people
Bulgarian footballers
Bulgaria youth international footballers
PFC Ludogorets Razgrad players
PFC Ludogorets Razgrad II players
PFC Spartak Pleven players
First Professional Football League (Bulgaria) players
Second Professional Football League (Bulgaria) players
Association football defenders